The qairaq or kairak are flat oval stones used as clappers or castanets. They are small enough to hold two in one hand and are used in the music of Tajik and Uzbek peoples. They are used as a percussion instrument and shaken, a pair in each hand to make clicking sounds and rattles.

Among the Tajiks, the instrument is played among those living in the plains or river valleys.

The kairak was photographed in 1869-1872 by a Russian photographer, who was documenting Russian Turkestan. He found the instrument in the hands of traveling musicians and photographed both the musicians playing it, as well as the instruments themselves. In one photo he laid the rocks out with the other instruments to be photographed.

A similar instrument to that in the Russian photos is in the collection of the Metropolitan Museum of Art. The instrument in the museum's collection was collected in Afghanistan.

Today qairaqs are used by women at marriage ceremonies and "life-cycle ceremonies."  In 1869. they were also played by batcha or "baz", dancing boys who sometimes dressed as women.

References

External links
Recording of qairaqs being played, solo

Persian musical instruments
Tajik musical instruments
Uzbekistani music
Concussion idiophones